Fly with Me may refer to:
Fly with Me (TV series), a TV series from Hong Kong station Television Broadcasts Limited
"Fly with Me" (Jonas Brothers song)
"Fly with Me" (Mumzy Stranger song)
"Fly with Me" (Artsvik song)
"Fly with Me!", a 1968 song by the short-lived psychedelic pop group The Avant-Garde
"Fly With Me", a 1998 song by 98 Degrees from the album 98 Degrees and Rising
Fly with Me (album), by Supermax (1979)

See also
Come Fly with Me (disambiguation)